The Gay Desperado is a 1936 comedy film starring Ida Lupino, Leo Carrillo, and Nino Martini and directed by Rouben Mamoulian, produced by Mary Pickford, and originally released by United Artists. The film was restored by the UCLA Film and Television Archive and the Mary Pickford Foundation, and released on DVD in 2006 by Milestone Pictures after being out of distribution for many years.

Portions of the film were shot in Tucson, Arizona and show the old adobe quarter Barrio Viejo of the City and Mission San Xavier Del Bac.

Plot
Chivo (Nino Martini), a singer who works in a movie theater providing live entertainment, is apprehended by a music-loving Mexican bandit Pablo Braganza (Leo Carrillo) who wants to make Chivo part of his band. Braganza, who admires American gangsters, also kidnaps Jane and her rich boyfriend Bill to become more like the American movie gangsters he admires.

Cast
 Ida Lupino as Jane
 Leo Carrillo as Pablo Braganza
 Nino Martini as Chivo
 Harold Huber as Juan Campo
 James Blakeley as Bill Shay
 Stanley Fields as Butch
 Mischa Auer as Diego

Reception 
Writing for The Spectator in 1936, Graham Greene gave the film a good review, describing it as "one of the best light comedies of the year". Greene asserts that "Mr. Mamoulian's camera is very persuasive" and together with the film's "careful compositions" and the overall intent of the film he summarizes the film as having "a framework of fine and mannered prose".

References

External links
 
 The Gay Desperado at Milestone Films

1936 films
United Artists films
1930s parody films
1930s crime comedy films
American crime comedy films
American parody films
Films directed by Rouben Mamoulian
Films shot in Arizona
Films shot in Tucson, Arizona
American black-and-white films
1936 comedy films
1930s American films